Pechatniki is a station of the Moscow Metro's Lyublinsko-Dmitrovskaya Line. The station was opened on 28 December 1995 as part of the first stage of the Lyublinsky radius, and is named after the district that it is situated in. The station is typical pillar-trispan, although it was the last of such design to be opened in Moscow to date. "Pechatniki" is the shallowest underground station in Moscow Metro.

The architects Yuri Orlov and A.Nekrasov designed the station in a unique way with no lighting above the black ceiling platforms and central wave-like anodised aluminium ceiling. The pillars are revetted with pink marble whist, the walls show greyish tint. The floor is laid with red and grey granite.

The station has one surface vestibule with access to Shosseinaya, Polbina and Guryanova streets. The vestibule is separately decorated with a large metallic panno Muscovites' work and rest (artist V. Bubnov). Just before the station is a service branch leading into the Pechatniki depot that serves the Lyublinskaya Line.

A transfer to the Bolshaya Koltsevaya line at Pechatniki is planned.

Gallery

References

External links

 Mymetro.ru
 news.metro.ru
 
 msk_pechatniki.livejournal.com LJ-community
 KartaMetro.info — Station location and exits on Moscow map (English/Russian)

Moscow Metro stations
Railway stations in Russia opened in 1995
Lyublinsko-Dmitrovskaya Line
Railway stations located underground in Russia